An annular solar eclipse occurred on May 30, 1984. A solar eclipse occurs when the Moon passes between Earth and the Sun, thereby totally or partly obscuring the image of the Sun for a viewer on Earth. An annular solar eclipse occurs when the Moon's apparent diameter is smaller than the Sun's, blocking most of the Sun's light and causing the Sun to look like an annulus (ring). An annular eclipse appears as a partial eclipse over a region of the Earth thousands of kilometres wide. Annularity was visible in Mexico, the United States, Azores Islands, Morocco and Algeria. It was the first annular solar eclipse visible in the US in 33 years. The moon's apparent diameter was near the average diameter because occurs 6.7 days after apogee (Apogee on May 24, 1984 at 01:00 UTC) and 7.8 days before perigee (Perigee on June 7, 1984 at 11:15 UTC).

Related eclipses

Eclipses of 1984 
 A penumbral lunar eclipse on May 15.
 An annular solar eclipse on May 30.
 A penumbral lunar eclipse on June 13.
 A penumbral lunar eclipse on November 8.
 A total solar eclipse on November 22.

Solar eclipses of 1982–1985

Saros 137 

It is a part of Saros cycle 137, repeating every 18 years, 11 days, containing 70 events. The series started with partial solar eclipse on May 25, 1389. It contains total eclipses from August 20, 1533 through December 6, 1695, first set of hybrid eclipses from December 17, 1713 through February 11, 1804, first set of annular eclipses from February 21, 1822 through March 25, 1876, second set of hybrid eclipses from April 6, 1894 through April 28, 1930, and second set of annular eclipses from May 9, 1948 through April 13, 2507. The series ends at member 70 as a partial eclipse on June 28, 2633. The longest duration of totality was 2 minutes, 55 seconds on September 10, 1569. Solar Saros 137 has 55 umbral eclipses from August 20, 1533 through April 13, 2507 (973.62 years).

Inex series

Metonic series

Notes

References

1984 5 30
1984 in science
1984 5 30
May 1984 events